Harold Gross may refer to:

 H. R. Gross (1899–1987), member of the United States House of Representatives from Iowa 1949–1975
 Harold B. Gross, lawyer, General Counsel of the Navy 1949–1953
 Harold Gross (Rhode Island), Lieutenant Governor of Rhode Island 1921–23